Lions Park station is a CTrain light rail system in Hounsfield Heights and Briar Hill, Calgary, Alberta, Canada. Opened on September 7, 1987 as part of the original Northwest Line (Route 201). It is located on the exclusive LRT right of way on the south side of 14 Avenue NW, just east of 19 Street NW.  Two side-loading platforms with ramp access from grade level as well as pedestrian crossings are located at both ends of the station. 

As part of Calgary Transit's plan to operate four-car trains by the end of 2014, all three-car platforms were to be extended. Lions Park Station had the platform extended to the East which also include an additional level crossing of the tracks, as well the pedestrian crossing of 14 Avenue NW was moved along with the platform. Construction started in Fall 2013 and finished in six months. This platform extension required no closures and didn't affect wheelchair ramp access. 

In 2008, the station registered an average of 5,800 weekday boardings.

References

CTrain stations
Railway stations in Canada opened in 1987
1987 establishments in Alberta